The Texas Football Classic was a high school football event that took place at the beginning of each football season at the Alamodome in San Antonio, Texas.  It was started in 1999 by the staff of Dave Campbell's Texas Football, an annual football publication that highlights every high school, college, and professional team in the state of Texas.  Since then, it has grown from three games to five and spans three days, usually over Labor Day weekend.

Among the notable players that have participated in short history of the Classic are former Texas Longhorns and former Chicago Bears running back Cedric Benson, former Houston Cougars and current Buffalo Bills quarterback Kevin Kolb, former Iowa Hawkeyes quarterback Drew Tate and former Missouri Tigers quarterback Chase Daniel.  The Texas Football Classic was not planned for 2011 due to a lack of resources.

History

1999
San Antonio Churchill 10, San Antonio Clark 7
Austin Westlake 42, Humble 20
Katy 21, Converse Judson 7

2000
Austin Westlake 17, San AntonioMacArthur 10
Texas City 39, Stephenville 33
Midland Lee High School 40, Victoria Memorial 12

2001
Bay City 9, LaGrange 0
San Antonio Madison 59, Corpus Christi Carroll 20
LaMarque 17, Schertz Clemens 16
Grapevine 27, Hays Consolidated 13

2002
Smithson Valley 43, Port Arthur Memorial 13
Fort Worth Dunbar 35, Brownwood 32
Copperas Cove 21, Odessa  Permian 13
San Antonio Roosevelt 35, Baytown Lee 14

2003
San Antonio Alamo Heights 31, Beeville Jones 6
Corpus Christi Calallen 31, San Marcos 0
The Woodlands 35, Bryan 20
Waco High 20, Abilene High 10
Donna 10, Lubbock  Monterey 8

2004
Kerrville Tivy 18, Pflugerville 15
Leander 24, Austin Westlake 19
Southlake Carroll 45, Midland Lee 14
Pearland 14, Fort Bend Kempner 0
Stephenville 13, New Braunfels 6

2005
San Antonio Marshall 28, San Antonio Churchill 24
Wolfforth Frenship 42, Boerne 24
San Antonio Reagan 34, Harlingen 11
LaMarque 35, Bay City 14
San Antonio O'Connor 44, McAllen 7

2006
San Antonio Madison 23, Seguin 11
New Braunfels Canyon 37, Pflugerville Hendrickson 7
Smithson Valley 17, The Woodlands 7
Austin Lake Travis 41, Texas City 34
McAllen Memorial 24, Victoria Memorial 22

2007
San Antonio Alamo Heights 17, San Antonio Clark 3
Pflugerville Connally 16, Fredericksburg 6
Leander 30, A&M Consolidated 12
Corpus Christi Calallen 21, Laredo United 14
San Antonio Warren 41, La Joya 0

2008
Georgetown 35, San Antonio Southwest 13
Austin Lake Travis 27, Round Rock Westwood 20
Katy Cinco Ranch 21, San Antonio Reagan 17
Brownwood 35, Burnet 24
Port Lavaca Calhoun 54, Mercedes 26

2009
Floresville 36, Fox Tech 13
Boerne-Champion 28, Midlothian 24
Brenham 37, Katy Mayde Creek 14
Duncanville 33, Odessa Permian 14
Cibolo Steele 35, SA East Central 14

2010
Uvalde 20, vs. Seguin 35
Abilene vs. Belton
Richmond Foster vs. El Paso Hanks
Gregory-Portland 22 vs. Port Neches-Groves 21
Georgetown vs. Killeen Harker Heights

References

High school football games in the United States
High school sports in Texas
American football competitions in San Antonio
Recurring sporting events established in 1999